Mach'ayniyuq (Quechua mach'ay cave, -ni, -yuq suffixes, "the one with a cave (or caves)", also spelled Machayniocc) is a mountain in the Andes of Peru high, about . It is situated in the Ayacucho Region, Cangallo Province, Paras District. Mach'ayniyuq lies southeast of Qarampa.

References

Mountains of Peru
Mountains of Ayacucho Region